Peter Portante (born February 24, 1996) is a professional, American race car driver from Plainville, Connecticut.

Peter Portante started his racing career at the age of 7 in karts. He quickly established himself as one of the up & coming drivers in the Northeast with the securing of many pole positions and wins on the Legend Car oval circuit and in the NASCAR Late Model division at Stafford Speedway.  Catching the open wheel bug, Peter joined the Skip Barber Race Series in 2012 to hone his race craft.  After claiming three wins, and a top-10 finish in the series points, Peter was invited to attend the Skip Barber Race Series Championship Shootout for a chance at a scholarship to become a Mazdaspeed backed driver.  Peter emerged from the shootout with a scholarship to the 2013 Cooper Tires U.S. F2000 National Championship Powered by Mazda. After signing with Belardi Auto Racing for the 2013 season, Peter earned 2 podium finishes as well as several top ten finishes. Adding to his resume in 2013, Peter won the SCCA Formula Continental National Championship with ArmsUp Motorsports.

Portante raced in the 2014 U.S. F2000 National Championship for ArmsUp Motorsports and improved to sixth in the championship and scored a career-best second-place finish at the Mid-Ohio Sports Car Course.

History

U.S. F2000 National Championship

References

External links
 Official Website

1996 births
Racing drivers from Connecticut
People from Plainville, Connecticut
Living people
SCCA National Championship Runoffs winners
U.S. F2000 National Championship drivers
Atlantic Championship drivers
 Formula Regional Americas Championship drivers
Belardi Auto Racing drivers